The 2000 Cape Verdean Football Championship season was the 21st of the competition of the first-tier football in Cape Verde. The competition started on 13 August and finished on 10 September, it started and finished later due to the 2000 Amílcar Cabral Cup that took place at Estádio da Várzea from May 4 to 14. The tournament was organized by the Cape Verdean Football Federation. FC Derby won their second title and later participated in the 2001 CAF Champions League the following year. Sporting Clube da Praia would be the only time that a non-participant would participate in the 2000 CAF Winners Cup, the criteria for qualification was not continued.

Overview 
The league was contested by 7 teams with FC Derby winning the championship.

GD Amarantes was the defending team of the title but was no participant in the competition. A total of 7 clubs (4 in Group A, 3 in Group B) participated in the competition, one from each island league, no club came from the islands of Brava and Maio as the competition was cancelled for the season. The season had a shorter 2-3 matches in Group A and 2 matches in Group B. There were only 10 matches, the total number of goals scored was only a low 19.

It was the last season they used the group system with the final matches, they would use the common ranking system with the club with the most points winning the title the following season. Not until the 2003 season they would use the group system with 4 matches and with playoffs though the semis would be added.

It marked the final appearance of GD Palmeira of Santa Maria at the national championship competition, their next national appearance for that club was the 2012 Cape Verdean Cup.

Participants 

 Académica Operária, winner of the Boa Vista Island League
 Vulcânicos FC, winner of the Fogo Island League
 GD Palmeira, winner of the Sal Island League
 CD Travadores, winner of the Santiago Island League.
 Solpontense Futebol Clube, winner of the Santo Antão Island League
 SC Atlético, winner of the São Nicolau Island League
 FC Derby, winner of the São Vicente Island League

Information about the clubs

League standings

Group A

Group B

Results

Positions by round

Group A

Group B

Finals

Statistics 
 Highest scoring match: Académica Operária 3 - 0 CD Travadores (20 August)

Notes

Footnotes

External links 
 https://web.archive.org/web/20150924011016/http://www.fcf.cv/pt/
 

Cape Verdean Football Championship seasons
1
Cape